Perfect World Pictures (PWPIC) is a Chinese and American entertainment company. Founded in 2008, it engages in the production, distribution and marketing of film and television content, content related advertising, merchandising business, and talent management business, as well as investment.

At the start of 2016, Perfect World announced a long term co-financing deal with Universal Pictures, which represents the first time a Chinese company has directly invested in a multi-year slate deal with a major American studio. as of 2023, Perfect World had reached up 50 films with Universal Pictures (leaving The Hunt uncredited) their partnership is unknown.

PWPIC trades on the Shenzhen Stock Exchange in China under Ticker 002624.

Chinese television series produced
List is incomplete. Only include shows which has its own page in Wikipedia.

Chinese films produced

Films co-financed with Universal Pictures or Focus Features

Non Universal-Focus films

See also
 Universal Studios
 Legendary Entertainment
 Working Title Films
 Blumhouse Productions
 Will Packer Productions
 RatPac Entertainment
 Miramax
 Columbia Pictures
 Sony Pictures Animation
 Intrepid Pictures
 China Film Group

References

Film production companies of China
Entertainment companies established in 2008
Companies listed on the Shenzhen Stock Exchange
Chinese companies established in 2008
Companies based in Beijing
Film production companies of the United States